14P/Wolf is a periodic comet in the Solar System.

Max Wolf (Heidelberg, Germany) discovered the comet on September 17, 1884. It was later discovered by, but not credited to, Ralph Copeland (Dun Echt Observatory, Aberdeen, Scotland) on September 23.

Previously, the comet had a perihelion of 2.74 AU and an orbital period of 8.84 a; this changed to a perihelion of 2.43 AU and an orbital period of 8.28 a due to passing 0.125 AU from Jupiter on September 27, 1922. The current values have been from when the comet passed Jupiter again on August 13, 2005. Another close approach to Jupiter on March 10, 2041 will return the comet to parameters similar to the period 1925–2000.

The comet nucleus is estimated to be 4.7 kilometers in diameter.

References

External links 
 14P at Kronk's Cometography
 14P at Kazuo Kinoshita's Comets
 14P at Seiichi Yoshida's Comet Catalog
 Orbital simulation from JPL (Java) / Horizons Ephemeris

Periodic comets
0014
Comets in 2017
18840917